The Water and Land Ritual paintings is a set thirty six Chinese mythological paintings from 1454. The paintings were part of a larger set, as indicated by the incomplete representation of certain themes on the extant scrolls. The majority of paintings (thirty four) are housed in the Guimet Museum and the remaining two are kept in the Cleveland Museum of Art.

References

1454 paintings
Ming dynasty painting
Mythological paintings